Brad Pitt (born 1963) is an American actor and film producer.

Brad Pitt may also refer to:

 Brad Pitt (boxer) (born 1981), Australian boxer 
 "Brad Pitt", a song by MØ from the 2022 album Motordrome

See also
 "Brad Pitt's Cousin", a 2016 song by Macklemore & Ryan Lewis featuring Xperience